is a Japanese josei manga series by Satoru Hiura. It has been adapted into 2 television drama series and a live action film that was released on 7 July 2012. Kodansha USA have licensed the manga for North American viewers. The spinoff were the Hotaru no Hikari SP (2014-2017) and Hotaru no Hikari BABY (2017-2021).

Cast
 Haruka Ayase as Hotaru
 Naohito Fujiki as Seiichi Takano

Reception
The film has grossed US$22,720,794.

References

External links
 

2004 manga
2007 Japanese television series debuts
2010 Japanese television series endings
Japanese drama television series
Japanese romance television series
Josei manga
Live-action films based on manga
Manga adapted into films
Manga series
Nippon TV dramas
Romance anime and manga
Japanese romance films